The Chernobyl Nuclear Power Plant sarcophagus or Shelter Structure is a massive steel and concrete structure covering the nuclear reactor number 4 building of the Chernobyl Nuclear Power Plant. Currently the sarcophagus resides inside the New Safe Confinement structure.  The New Safe Confinement is designed to protect the environment while the sarcophagus undergoes demolition and the nuclear cleanup continues.  The sarcophagus was designed to limit radioactive contamination of the environment following the 1986 Chernobyl disaster, by encasing the most dangerous area and protecting it from climate exposure. It is located within a large restricted area known as the Chernobyl Exclusion Zone.

By 1996 the structure had deteriorated to the point where numerous stabilization measures were required. It was decided that the sarcophagus would be replaced with the New Safe Confinement, construction of which was completed in 2017.

Construction

The design of the sarcophagus started on 20 May 1986, 24 days after the disaster. Subsequent construction lasted for 206 days, from June to late November of the same year. Due to high radiation levels, it was impossible to directly screw down the nuts and bolts or apply any direct welding to the sarcophagus, so this work was done remotely where possible. The seams of the sarcophagus, however, could not be fully sealed.

The entire construction process consisted of eight stages: clearing and concreting of territory around reactor unit 4, erection of initial reinforced concrete protective walls around the perimeter, construction of separation walls between units 3 and 4, cascade wall construction, covering of the turbine hall, mounting of a high-rise buttress wall, erection of supports and installation of a reactor compartment covering and finally the installation of a ventilation system.

The building ultimately enclosed  of heavily contaminated debris inside, together with contaminated soil. On 11 October 1986 the Soviet Governmental Commission accepted a report entitled "Conclusion on Reliability and Durability of a Covering Constructions and Radiation Safety of Chernobyl NPP Unit 4 Reactor Compartment". The sarcophagus has over 60 bore holes to allow observation of the interior of the core. In many places the structure was designed to have ventilation shafts to allow some convection inside. Filtration systems have been put in place so that no radioactive material will escape through these holes.

Ongoing issues

The present shelter is constructed on top of the ruins of the reactor building. The "Mammoth Beam" that supports the roof of the shelter rests partly on the structurally unsound west wall of the reactor building that was damaged by the accident. The western end of the shelter roof is supported by a wall at a point designated axis 50. This wall is reinforced concrete and was cracked by the accident.

Designed Stabilisation Steel Structure
The DSSS is a yellow steel object that has been placed next to the wrecked reactor; it is 63 meters (207 ft) tall and has a series of cantilevers that extend through the western buttress wall, and is intended to stabilize the sarcophagus. This was done because if the wall of the reactor building or the roof of the shelter were to collapse, then large amounts of radioactive dust and particles would be released directly into the atmosphere, resulting in a large new release of radioactivity into the environment. In December 2006 the "Designed Stabilisation Steel Structure" (DSSS) was extended until 50% of the roof load (about 400 tons) was transferred from the axis 50 wall to the DSSS.

Upper Biological Shield
A further threat to the shelter is the steel and concrete slab that formed the upper biological shield (UBS), situated above the reactor prior to the accident.  This concrete slab was thrown upwards by the explosion in the reactor core and now rests at approximately 15° from vertical. The position of the upper bioshield is considered inherently unsafe, as only debris supports it in its nearly upright position. A collapse of the bioshield would further exacerbate the dust conditions in the shelter, possibly spreading some quantity of radioactive materials out of the shelter, and could damage the shelter itself. The UBS is a disk 17.7 meters in diameter, weighing 1000 tons. The shield is formally called Component E and nicknamed Elena. The twisted fuel bundles still attached to it are called Elena's hair.

Replacement

On 22 December 1988, Soviet scientists announced that the sarcophagus would only last 20–30 years before requiring restorative maintenance work. In 1998, with the help of the European Bank for Reconstruction and Development, a conservation programme was completed that included securing the roof beams from collapsing. Nonetheless, the rain-induced corrosion of supporting beams still threatens the sarcophagus' integrity. It was revealed that the water is leaking through the sarcophagus via holes in its roof, becoming radioactively contaminated, and then seeping through the reactor's floor into the soil.

The Chernobyl New Safe Confinement, rolled into place in November 2016, allows for the dismantling of the sarcophagus and for radioactive material to be removed. The containment was expected to replace the existing sarcophagus in 2015. However, delays and a €100 million funding gap caused a yearlong delay, before being moved into place in November 2016.

, the building is undergoing testing of its installed systems.

References

Notes

Further reading
 - Total pages: 336 
 - Total pages: 43 

 - Total pages: 239

External links 
 

Chernobyl Nuclear Power Plant Sarcophagus
Buildings and structures completed in 1986
Energy infrastructure completed in 1986
Buildings and structures in Pripyat
Nuclear safety and security
1986 establishments in Ukraine